Henry Gawler (1766–1852) was an English barrister. Gawler was one of seven people who wrote the Royal Commission into the Operation of the Poor Laws 1832, a report which recommended changes to the Poor Law system in England and Wales. Three portraits of him as a schoolboy appear in the National Portrait Gallery, London.

References

English lawyers
Poor Law in Britain and Ireland
1776 births
1852 deaths
English barristers
19th-century English people